"Babe" is a song by the American rock band Styx. It was the lead single from the band's 1979 triple-platinum album Cornerstone. The song was Styx's first, and only, US number-one single, spending two weeks at No. 1 in December 1979, serving as the penultimate number-one single of the 1970s. "Babe" also went to No. 9 on the Adult Contemporary chart.  It additionally held the number-one spot for six weeks on the Canadian RPM national singles chart, charting in December 1979 and becoming the opening chart-topper of the 1980s. It was also the band's only UK Top 40 hit, peaking at No. 6. It also reached No. 1 in South Africa.

Background and content
The song was written by member Dennis DeYoung as a birthday present for his wife Suzanne.  The theme of the song is "the separation of two people."  DeYoung stated of it that "If they've figured out what's more important than a relationship between two people, I don't know what it is. The finished track was recorded as a demo with just DeYoung and Styx members John Panozzo and Chuck Panozzo playing on the track, with DeYoung singing all of the harmonies himself.

The song was not originally intended to be a Styx track, but Styx members James "J.Y." Young and Tommy Shaw convinced DeYoung to put the song on Cornerstone. As a result, DeYoung's demo was placed on Cornerstone with Shaw overdubbing a guitar solo in the song's middle section.

Reception
Cash Box said it has "crystalline singing and airy electric piano leads" but that the "high harmonies are the highlight."  Billboard called it a "melodic pop number" that should break the band into adult contemporary playlists.  Record World highlighted the "playful keyboards", "youthful lead vocal", "full harmony chorus and ascending lead guitar runs."

Eric Hegedus of The Morning Call considered it one of the best examples of Styx's "newfound mastery of the techniques needed to perform slow love songs" and highlighted the "deceptively simple lyrics."  Rolling Stone critic David Fricke described it as a lush ballad.

The track became a major hit, reaching No. 1 on the US Billboard Hot 100, and was their only major UK hit single, reaching No. 6.  The song also won a People's Choice Award as the best song in 1980.

In popular culture
In 1999, "Babe" was included in the soundtrack to the film Big Daddy, starring Adam Sandler, whose character is a huge fan of Styx.

Personnel
Dennis DeYoung – lead and backing vocals, Fender Rhodes electric piano, synthesizer
Tommy Shaw – lead guitar 
Chuck Panozzo – bass
John Panozzo – drums

Chart history

Weekly charts

Year-end charts

All-time charts

Certifications

Caught in the Act version

In 1997 Dutch boy band Caught in the Act covered "Babe" on their album Vibe. The song's success was modest.

Music video 
In the music video, the band members play soldiers and perform the song both in a barracks and on patrol. They take a look at a waitress.

Track listing
CD maxi
 "Babe" (Radio Mix) – 4:28	
 "Babe" (Cloud 9 Mix) – 4:25	
 "Babe" (Gee Extended Mix) – 6:42	
 "Don't Just Leave Me Now" (Radio Version) – 4:46

Charts

References

1979 songs
1979 singles
1997 singles
Songs written by Dennis DeYoung
Styx (band) songs
Billboard Hot 100 number-one singles
Cashbox number-one singles
RPM Top Singles number-one singles
Number-one singles in South Africa
A&M Records singles
ZYX Music singles
American soft rock songs